The Second cabinet of Ólafur Jóhannesson in Iceland was formed 1 September 1978.

Cabinet

Inaugural cabinet: 1 September 1978 – 15 October 1979

See also
Government of Iceland
Cabinet of Iceland

References

Olafur Johannesson, Second cabinet of
Olafur Johannesson, Second cabinet of
Olafur Johannesson, Second cabinet of
Cabinets established in 1978
Cabinets disestablished in 1979
Progressive Party (Iceland)